Haami is a 2018 Bengali film directed by Nandita Roy and Shiboprosad Mukherjee. The movie is produced by Windows and is distributed regionally by the same. As per the figures provided by trade magazine. Film Companion, it was the highest grosser in  Bengali cinema in 2018. Haami is a tale of two friends, Bhutu and Chini, who comes from entirely different backgrounds. Before Haami, Nandita Roy and Shiboprosad Mukherjee came up with Ramdhanu which also dealt with the story of harried parents and what they go through in order to put their children in good schools. Haami could well be considered as a sequel to this,  where Laltu and Mitali's characters are played by the same cast i.e. Shiboprosad Mukherjee and Gargi Roy Chowdhury.The Malayalam rights of this movie have been acquired by Rajesh Nair, who made Salt Mango Tree, based on the same film.

Plot  
Laltu Biswas (Shiboprosad Mukherjee) and Mitali Biswas (Gargi Roy Chowdhury) are the parents of Bhutu (Broto Banerjee). Mitali is a homemaker and Laltu is a furniture showroom owner. Their son, Bhutu, studies in one of the top schools of Kolkata, where he meets his best friend,  Chini (Tiyasha Pal). Contrary to Bhutu's background, Chini comes from a highly intellectual and sophisticated family where her parents, Srinjoy Sen (Sujan Mukhopadhyay) and Rina Sen (Churni Ganguly), are both academicians.
Bhutu being a diehard Salman Khan fan like his father, happens to know all the antics from Salman Khan films. He is the self-proclaimed 'bhaijaan' at school and gets into a scuffle with a classmate because of his antics. Bhutu thinks that he should let Chini know about his feelings towards her and tells her that he loves her and wishes to marry her someday. Chini ends up telling this to her parents. Keeping Chini's involvement in mind the school authorities summon Chini's parents as well which leads to a confrontation between the parents, who end up having a brawl. The Sens decide to change Chini's school and take her away from Bhutu. After getting a good scolding from his mother, Bhutu decides not to speak to Chini anymore and stops sitting beside her at school, which hurts Chini. Soon their sections are also changed.
However, after watching someone getting married on TV, Bhutu decides to marry Chini by putting sindoor on her. Meanwhile, another child from the class, stands witness to this plan and reports it to the class teacher,  who is again forced to take it up with the principal. Both set of parents are summoned again. Though the parents are miffed with each other and the school, they realise at the end how innocent and pure Bhutu and Chini's bonding is.

Cast and crew 
 Broto Banerjee as Bodhiswata Biswas/Bhutu/Bhaijaan
 Tiyasha Pal as Tanuruchi Sen/Chini
 Abhiraj Karan as Ajat Shotru Rakshit/Kuchu
 Tanushree Shankar as Principal
 Aparajita Adhya as Arundhati, School Councellor
 Shiboprosad Mukherjee as Laltu Biswas, Bhutu's father
 Gargi Roychowdhury as Mitali Biswas, Bhutu's mother
 Koneenica Banerjee as Shyamoli Rakshit, Ajat Shotru's mother
 Kharaj Mukherjee as Dilip Rakshit - Ajat Shotru's father and local MLA
 Masood Akhtar as Chacha jaan
 Sujan Mukhopadhyay as Srinjoy Sen, Chini's father
 Churni Ganguly as Rina Sen, Chini's mother
 Debolina Dutta as Jhumur Paul's mother
 Devlina Kumar as Sohini, Bhutu and Chini's teacher

 Shreyan Bhattacharya in a special appearance as himself

Soundtrack 
The music of the film is directed and composed by Anindya Chatterjee. Bhutu Bhaijan, the song based on Bhutu that became an overnight sensation, has been composed by Arindam Chatterjee. All the other songs of the movie have been sung by children, which is rare in Bengali cinema. Only a promotional song that is not in the film has been sung by Babul Supriyo.
Every song of Haami was released on YouTube and other digital platforms and a special album was also released. The music of Haami also earned Mirchi Best Music Award of the Year (2018).

Release and screening
Haami was released on 11 May 2018 and was premiered in Nandan. The film was initially shown in Navina Cinema and a few other halls after it was rejected by seven prime theatres of Kolkata. The movie ran in theatres for 60 consecutive days.

Awards 

 Most Popular film of the year by WBFJA (2018)
 Mirchi Best Music Award of the Year(2018)
 Most watched film all time by Hoichoi 
 Best Music Album of the year
 Best Music Composer of the year
 Best  Lyricist – Anindya Chatterjee
 Best Female Vocalist of the year.- Aruna Das
 Best Child Actor - Broto Banerjee

References

External links
 
 

2018 films
Bengali-language Indian films
2010s Bengali-language films
Films directed by Nandita Roy and Shiboprosad Mukherjee
Films scored by Arindam Chatterjee
Films scored by Anindya Chatterjee